Lahoo Ke Do Rang  is a 1997 Hindi suspense-action film directed by Mehul Kumar, starring Akshay Kumar, Karishma Kapoor, Naseeruddin Shah, and Suresh Oberoi. This was Akshay Kumar and Naseeruddin Shah's second film together; the first being the 1994 film Mohra.

Plot 

Customs Officer, Bharat Srivastav lives a mediocre life with his sister Rajni, wife Sangita, and his son. Rajni is to be married to Inspector Gautam who is known for his unorthodox methods of apprehending smugglers. These methods land him in trouble with the Shikari brothers (Tejaa, Dharma, Tinnu, Chinnu and Pappu). Bharat decides to oppose the brothers, and as a result, the three recruit false eyewitnesses, pay them to give false testimonies, and get the complaint discharged. When Bharat persists, his family is kidnapped and subsequently killed. Bharat manages to kill some of the culprits, but is arrested, found guilty, and sentenced to life in prison. On the way to the prison facility, a vehicle carrying Bharat is involved in an accident, killing everyone on board. Relieved at the death of their nemesis, the Shikari brothers celebrate – only to find out that they now face an unknown enemy who proceeds to kill them all.

Cast
Naseeruddin Shah as Bharat Srivastav
Akshay Kumar as Sikandar Davai
Karishma Kapoor as Hina
Farah Naaz as Sangita Srivastav
Mukesh Rawal as Doctor
Alok Nath as Abu Baba
Farida Jalal as Halima
Suresh Oberoi as Dharma Shikari
Mukesh Rishi as Teja Shikari
Mahesh Anand as Tinnu Shikari
Tej Sapru as Chinnu Shikari
Mushtaq Khan as Pappu Shikari
Avtaar Gill as Advocate Hassubhai Shah
K. K. Raj as Sampath, custom officer
Mulraj Rajda as Judge in Court
Navin Nischol as DCP A.A. Khan, father of Sikander.
Aparajita as Mrs. A.A. Khan, mother of Sikander.
ShashiKala as Chachi
Dinesh Hingoo as Chandu Tolani
Tiku Talsania as Kaalu/Kalyendar Swami
Vishwajeet Pradhan as Inspector Gautam
Shiva Rindani as Salim Surti

Soundtrack

Music: Anand-Milind | Lyrics: Sameer

External links 
 
[./Https://boxofficeindia.com/movie.php%3Fmovieid%3D2698 Lahu Ke Do Rang] at India

1997 films
1990s Hindi-language films
Films scored by Anand–Milind
Films directed by Mehul Kumar